Princess Amelia Sophia Eleonore of Great Britain (10 June 1711 (New Style) – 31 October 1786) was the second daughter of King George II of Great Britain and Queen Caroline.

Early life
Princess Amelia was born at Herrenhausen Palace, Hanover, Germany, on 30 May 1711 (Old Style). At the time of her birth, her father was Hereditary Prince of Brunswick-Lüneburg, son and heir of the Elector of Hanover. Her mother was Caroline of Ansbach, daughter of Johann Friedrich, Margrave of Brandenburg-Ansbach. She was known to her family as Emily.

Great Britain
On 1 August 1714, Queen Anne of Great Britain and Ireland died. Princess Amelia's grandfather succeeded her to become George I of Great Britain, in accordance with the provisions of the Act of Settlement 1701. Amelia's father, now heir apparent to the throne of Great Britain, was made Duke of Cornwall and created Prince of Wales on 27 September 1714. She moved to Great Britain with her family and they took up residence at St James's Palace in London.

Though comparatively healthy as an adult, Amelia was a sickly child and her mother employed Johann Georg Steigerthal and Hans Sloane to treat her as well as secretly asking advice from physician John Freind. In 1722, her mother, who had progressive ideas,  had Amelia and her sister Caroline inoculated against smallpox by an early type of immunisation known as variolation, which had been brought to England from Constantinople by Lady Mary Wortley Montagu and Charles Maitland. On 11 June 1727, George I died and her father succeeded him as George II. She lived with her father until his death in 1760.

Amelia's aunt Sophia Dorothea, Queen of Prussia suggested Amelia as a suitable wife for her son Frederick (later known as Frederick the Great) but his father Frederick William I of Prussia forced his son to marry Elisabeth Christine of Brunswick-Bevern instead.

Amelia greatly enjoyed riding and hunting. She was disliked by artistic fops such as John, Lord Hervey, and Lady Pomfret considered her "one of the oddest princesses that ever was known; she has ears shut to flattery and her heart open to honesty."

Amelia may have been the mother of composer Samuel Arnold (1740–1802) through an affair with a commoner of the name Thomas Arnold.

Later life
In 1751, Princess Amelia became ranger of Richmond Park after the death of Robert Walpole, 2nd Earl of Orford. Immediately afterwards, the Princess caused major public uproar by closing the park to the public, only allowing few close friends and those with special permits to enter.

This continued until 1758, when a local brewer, John Lewis, took the gatekeeper, who stopped him from entering the park, to court. The court ruled in favour of Lewis, citing the fact that, when Charles I enclosed the park in the 17th century, he allowed the public right of way in the park. Princess Amelia was forced to lift the restrictions.

The Princess was generous in her gifts to charitable organisations.  In 1760 she donated £100 to the society for educating poor orphans of clergymen (later the Clergy Orphan Corporation) to help pay for a school for 21 orphan daughters of clergymen of the Church of England.  In 1783 she agreed to become an annual subscriber of £25 to the new County Infirmary in Northampton.

In 1761, Princess Amelia became the owner of Gunnersbury Estate, Middlesex, purchased from the estate of Henry Furnese. Princess Amelia used Gunnersbury as her summer residence. She added a chapel and at some time between 1777 and 1784, she commissioned a bath house, extended as a folly by a subsequent owner of the land in the 19th century, which still stands today with a Grade II English Heritage listing and is known as Princess Amelia's Bathhouse.

She also owned a property in Cavendish Square, Soho, London, where she died unmarried on 31 October 1786, at which time she was the last surviving child of King George II and Queen Caroline. A miniature of Prince Frederick of Prussia was found on her body. She was buried in the Henry VII Lady Chapel in Westminster Abbey.

Legacy

Amelia Island in Florida, United States, is named for her, as is Amelia County in Virginia, United States.

Arms
On 31 January 1719, as a grandchild of the sovereign, Amelia was granted use of the arms of the realm, differenced by a label argent of five points ermine. On 30 August 1727, as a child of the sovereign, Amelia's difference changed to a label argent of three points ermine.

Ancestors

References

Bibliography
 
 Van der Kiste, John (1997) George II and Queen Caroline. Stroud, Gloucestershire: Sutton Publishing. .

External links 
 Letters from or relating to Princess Augusta Sophia Eleanor at the Royal Collection

1711 births
1786 deaths
18th-century British people
18th-century British women
British princesses
House of Hanover
Burials at Westminster Abbey
Nobility from Hanover
German people of Scottish descent
German expatriates in England
Children of George II of Great Britain
Residents of White Lodge, Richmond Park
Daughters of kings